Hitgar (also Romanized as Hītgar; also known as Hītkar-e Bālā) is a village located in Irandegan Rural District, Irandegan District, Khash County, Sistan and Baluchestan Province, Iran. According to the 2006 census, it has a population of 285, these number is distributed in 64 families.

References 

Populated places in Khash County